is a Japanese manga series written and illustrated by Boichi. The plot tells the story of Ken, a high school delinquent turned down by the girl he loved, Yumin, who promptly left Japan to become a police officer in Korea. Yearning to see the girl he loved, Ken dropped out of high school to travel to Korea and become an officer just like Yumin. Though Ken managed to travel to Korea, he found himself unable to become an officer and instead became a poor shut-in with no money or job. After saving an old man from being abused by a group gang members, he was scouted by the head of a local gang led by Tae-Soo Park, who made him the new boss. The manga was licensed by JManga, but is now available through a read-only/print-only subscription at BookWalker and Crunchyroll. It was serialized in Shōnen Gahosha's seinen manga magazine Young King from April 2006 to February 2016, with its chapters collected in twenty-five tankōbon volumes. In North America, the manga was licensed by Manga Planet.

Plot
The story revolves around Ken (the main protagonist), a man from an upper-class family that was orphaned young due to his family's involvement with the Yakuza; he became a highschool delinquent known for fighting. The only thing that motivates him to take action is through his romantic affections for a classmate, Yumin. After learning she decided to move to Korea to become a police officer, Ken left his life in Japan behind and tried to follow in Yumin's footsteps; due to unforeseen circumstances, he incidentally becomes the head of a local gang and tries to hide it from Yumin. As the leader, the gang is renamed the Sun-Ken Rock Group. At first, the gang only consisted of few members and didn't even have a base. As the story progresses The Sun-Ken Rock gang becomes bigger as they recruited new members and take over other gangs' territories and investments. The Sun-Ken Rock Group acquires an MMORPG company, a large casino, one of the biggest television media companies in Korea, as well as garnering political favors (making them the most powerful gang in Korea). However, throughout all of this, Ken has done his best to evade revealing himself to Yumin as a gang leader as she despises gangs. Ironically, Yumin was groomed to become an advanced plant in Korea to help her Yakuza group lay the foundations to expand their hold into South Korea; due to Yumin's refusal to join the "family business," their plans were stalled as various members either tried to take her back to Japan or try to get her back into Yakuza control. In between Ken's rise, he and Yumin got closer and Yumin started to have feelings for Ken. However, things were always complicated by the interference of either Ken's gang activities and/or Yumin's Yakuza connections. The series, despite being very adult-oriented, espouses many shonen-esque values, such as the importance of friendship and the concept of being a "true man". The turning point in the story was when she was kidnapped by her own group and Ken was exposed as a gang leader in his attempts to rescue her from his greatest rival, Kim Ban Phong (a Vietnamese-Korean that has a vicious score to settle with Ken). The manga has three spin-offs "Dango Knight ", "Sun Ken Rock Gaiden - Yumin" and "I Want Feed Yumin".

Characters
 
 A high-school delinquent and the primary protagonist who drops out of school and leaves Japan in pursuit of his love, Yumin. While in Korea he lives his life as a shut-in for an entire year, being unable to find an actual job. After saving an old man from being killed by loan sharks, he was scouted and invited to join a local gang (gondal) to work under Tae-soo as one of his underlings. After fighting against Tae-soo, he was offered the position of boss instead. He initially declined since he wanted to join the police force alongside Yumin but Tae-soo eventually manipulates him into taking the position. His strength and sense of justice earns him the loyalty of his gang and the local community. As the leader of the Sun-Ken Rock Gang, he often hides his true identity from others (e.g.: he tells Yumin he works at a video game company as a cover). Ken's parents were killed during a yakuza war when he was 13. The manga ends with him handing all of his businesses over to Yumi, so that he and his gang can act as protectors of Japan rather than criminals, with the final panel showing him driving by the place where he first told Yumi he loved her, with the implication that, though they can never be together, Ken will always love her.
 
 Ken's love interest, a girl who left Japan to become a cop in the department in charge of organized crime. She initially claims to be a Korean girl by the name of Yumin, as she did not want anyone to be suspicious of her immediately leaving for Korea out of the blue. Her true name is Yumi and she is actually Japanese. She hates gangsters, though later it is discovered that she is the daughter of a Japanese yakuza boss who killed Ken's parents. Her hatred of gangs is due to her mother and sister being killed by other yakuza when she was young. As the daughter of a yakuza boss, she has mastered some martial arts and is a very capable fighter. She also has feelings for Ken while not knowing he is an underworld boss. Later she was kidnapped by Kim Ban-Phuong's gang who hold her hostage. She is shocked when she finds that Ken is the boss from Ban-Phuong. Feeling betrayed at first, she confronts Ken only to forgive him after an apology later, after which she cheers him on the duel with Ban-Phuong. The two decide to attack her father's headquarters, but to first take time off at a popular vacation hot spot and finally make love in a church during a storm. It is eventually revealed that Yumi had been manipulating Ken to help her seize control of the White Dragon Clan at first, only to actually fall in love with him. After the two kill Ryu, Yumi destroys the White Dragon Clan headquarters and takes control of the organization, though she has become depressed over her feelings for Ken, which had changed into self-loathing for having betrayed his love.

A Korean gangster and the true mastermind behind most of the gang's more underhanded actions. Originally the boss of the gang, he passed leadership over to Ken as he realized his potential and charisma. He serves as Ken's right hand man, and has numerous underground connections and is in charge of handling the day-to-day business of the gang. He can be seen as the real evil behind the gang and is often doing dirty works for the gang, but his loyalty to Ken is unquestionable. He took over the gang after his father was killed. He was put into a coma by Ban-Phuong but later recovers.
While he initially puts full trust in Ken, the difference between their principles eventually renders their positions as 1st and 2nd in command in the gang blurry. He eventually usurps control from Ken in a bloodless coup, only to reveal that it was a ploy to make himself the scapegoat for all of Sun-Ken Rock Group's crimes and allow Ken and their friends to fight the White Dragon Clan without worry.

One of the original members of Tae-Soo's gang and one of Ken's henchman. He dislikes Ken and often comes into conflict with him.  While his loyalty is sometimes questionable, he is highly competitive and does not back down from a fight. He left his village when he was 16 after he had sex with a farmer's wife. Later on San-dae finds his hometown turned into a US Army base and realizes that he can never go back to his previous life. His nickname comes from the fact that he uses an actual pickaxe in combat. His past reveals that San-dae used to be a superhero/vigilante called Diago Knight and was rejected by female supervillains.

One of the members of the gang. He is known for his muscular physique but meek demeanor. Ken recruited Chang in a fight by using a variety of tactics to take him down. Despite his muscular and big physique, he is quite agile, able to dodge and block two professional killers at te same time. He loves his car and his hobby taking care of it. He apparently dies in Chapter 84 falling from a building under construction, but survives the fall thanks to his car. He is also a foodie and lover of Japanese cuisine. In volume 12 he lost his virginity to prostitute in Kiss Club

The first member of Tae-Soo's gang after the death of Tae-Soo's father long before the story begins and one of Ken's henchmen. He is loyal to both Tae-Soo and Ken. An Ex-Korean soldier, he often fights dual-handed with wrenches.

Female member of the gang, also the "cleaner" of the Sun-Ken Group. Is a weapons specialist and the 'cleaner' of the group. She mainly uses knives, and is obsessed with Ken.
Ji-Hae "Miss Yoo" Yoo
A Tea house barmaid in trouble with the local gang during the first chapters of the story. She has feelings for Ken and tried seducing him after Kim Bon-Phuong defeated Ken. Eventually, she returns to her hometown but is again raped and captured by the Garugi Gang. She is discovered by Ken one night at a brothel and she makes him swear to take over the Pleasure District to save the prostitutes.
Oh Dal-Soo 
a corrupt businessman whose son was beaten by Yang-bae and later arrested. He asks Ken to find the man behind his son's beating.
Rei Huzimi
Rei is a bodyguard of Yumin's father who saved her from her Yazuka past. He also bears a striking resemblance with Ken. He develops feelings for Yumin and is forced by her father, the boss of the Japanese Yakuza, to kill her, but is defeated by her. He later fights Ken in Ryu's office, where Ken defeats him by exploiting his desperation to be loved by Yumi.
Kim Ban-Phuong
Lai Daihan (Born to a Korean father and Vietnamese mother). Ban-Phuong's parents met during the Vietnam war when his father Kim Jin-hae was a soldier who saved his mother as a child from getting shot by Korean soldiers. Later he felt guilty and returned to Vietnam in 1988 to apologize; later they were married. Ban-Phoung was trained by his father and learned martial arts from him and his uncle. When his father died, Ban-Phoung traveled to South Korea and fell in love with the Vietnamese girl Hae-yi. Their relationship was sadly short-lived as she committed suicide shortly after her boss attempted to rape her. Ban-Phoung killed these men and join the Garugi Gang. He later defeated Ken and disappeared. Ban-Phuong has returned as the leader of an assassins guild, under the command of the White Dragon clan. He revealed to Yumin Ken's secret. He was killed trying to save Ken and Yumin from her father's henchmen.
Bae-Dal
a former monk turned casino director who trained Ken and his group for ten months. Enjoying the luxury, he eventually loses his touch but stills proves to be a contender.

An Italian man who is a failed pornographic actor. He is a ladies man and is next in line to a powerful Italian Mafia. He is quite agile, but uses this skill mostly to escape. He joined Ken's gang with blessings from the mafia, with the hidden agenda to kill Ken if he grows too powerful. Although he is quite the ladies' man, he is troubled by premature ejaculation. He has recently been forced to return to Italy due to the death of Don Prego so that he can succeed the aforementioned Don, though he still values the time he spent with Ken and the others.
Sun
A Famous K-Pop singer who Ken becomes a road manager for during an identity crisis.
Don Prego
A famous boss known throughout Italy as one of the powerful mafia bosses ever. He has ordered Benito to follow Ken but kill him if he grows too powerful.
Han
The corrupt District attorney whom Yumin is working with. He is attracted to Yumi and does not know her secret.
Kim Yang-bae
 A Casino dealer and ex-pit fighter who fought Ken during the casino arc. He was once a homeless boy who was taken care of Tae Soo's father. He later became a member of the Sun-Ken Rock Group after losing to Ken.
Ryu Yoshizawa
Yumin's father and boss of the White Dragon Clan, the one who killed Ken's parents. He sent his own daughter, Yumin, to South Korea to act as a vanguard for the family yakuza. When Yumin fled, he sends Rei to track her down. To gain control of South Korea, he hires the assassin's guild to defeat the "strongest gang in Korea", not knowing that it is the Ken Rock Gang.
Muftal Batil 
Members of the Kim Ban-Phuong's gang. He is originally from Kazakhstan but came to Korea to chase after his sister, who married a Korean. He tracks her down to a brothel where he then kills everyone, including his sister's husband. His sister commits suicide, causing him to go into depression. He meets BanPhuong and greatly respects him.
Kim Gae-ha
Owner of KG Entertainment who used aspiring singers as sex slaves. He hates Ken for the fact that Ken can possibly ruin his future at the agency and sought the help of the Ken Rock Gang to help in getting rid of him, not knowing Ken is the leader. Once he starts distributing the girls to powerful politicians for his greed, Ken defeats him.
Director Yan Tae-shin
Works with KG Entertainment under Gae-Ha. Both he and Gae-Ha sexually abused young girls who sought celebrity and stardom. When the pop idol group became expendable, Tae-Shin is overcome with guilt since he has built a bond with them overtime. He is forced by Ken to stay with the company to atone for his sins against young women.
Jang Ah-jung
A member of girl group is daughter of politician Jang Yunchang. Her father specifically request to lay with her during the KG Entitlement merge.
Minhiro
a member of girl group with short hair and big breasts. She and Na Yun-jeong become close through a photoshoot.
 Na Yun-jeong
A member of girl group, she lived as a homeless person in the United States, and then was found by the agency. She apparently is bisexual and masochistic.
Jang Yunchang
A corrupt politician who lusted after his illegitimate daughter Ah-Jung. He is kept alive by Tae-Soo so that he can be manipulated and blackmailed for the sex scandal against his own daughter. 
Ju-Mon 
Chef lieutenant who worked under Man-Gu. Despite hating Man-Gu, Ju-Mon respects him for his professionalism. He later defects to Ken.
Hui-Rin 
The first lieutenant, recruited by Man-Gu, that Ken fought against. He is a veteran who was extremely skilled. He later defects to serve Ken instead.
 Cherry twins
Twin sisters who are both lieutenants under Man-Gu. After fighting Ken, they defect to him.
Moon Ji-Ae 
Sun's manager who does not hold Ken in high regards, often calling him poor.
Oh Man-Won 
Sun's manager-in-chief in KG Entitlement. He and Ken work to make sure that Sun is generally provided for during road trips to her live performances.
Lee Man-gu
Imperial Casino Director who previously worked under TaeSoo's father and later betrays him to gain control of the casino. Initially, he employed the Ken Rock Gang against DalSoo, of the Fine Corporation, but refused to pay them afterwards. Despite recruiting five lieutenants to fight against Ken, he is defeated and is forced to hand over the paperwork of the casino. He is killed by BanPhuong while Kae-Lyn attempted to kill him. 
Nami
A 16-year-old runaway who met Benito Armani and was saved by him from a gang.
Goshi-Wan
A Korean man who became Ken's roommate and friend. It is revealed he may be based on Boichi.

References

External links

2008 manga
Manga series
Martial arts anime and manga
Organized crime in anime and manga
Seinen manga
Shōnen Gahōsha manga
Yakuza in anime and manga